The  is a limited express train service in Japan operated by the third-sector railway operator Chizu Express and West Japan Railway Company (JR West), which runs between  and  in Tottori Prefecture at a maximum speed of 130 km/h (81 mph).

Stops

Trains stop at the following stations:

 –  –  –  – –  – – –  – –  –  –  –  –  –  –

Stations in brackets are stations where not all trains stop at.

 Only Super Hakuto no 13 stops at Kōbe, Nishi-Akashi, and Kakogawa 
 Only Super Hakuto no 1 and 3 stop at Aioi 
 Super Hakuto no 9 and 13 terminate at Tottori

Rolling stock

Super Hakuto
 HOT7000 series tilting DMUs (since 3 December 1994)

Hakuto
 KiHa 181 series DMUs (3 December 1994 - November 1997)

Formation
Services are normally formed of five-car HOT7000 series sets, as shown below, with car 5 at the Kyoto end. All cars are non-smoking, although cars 1 and 5 have smoking rooms.

 Car 5 is sometimes replaced by a HOT7020 car with a gangwayed cab end.

History
Super Hakuto services commenced on 3 December 1994. Initially, Hakuto services using JR West KiHa 181 series DMUs were also operated over the same route, but these were discontinued from November 1997, from which date all six return services daily became Super Hakuto operating at a maximum speed of 130 km/h.

All cars were made non-smoking from 1 June 2008, from which time smoking rooms were added to cars 1 and 5.

References

External links

 Chizu Express Super Hakuto 
 JR West Super Hakuto HOT7000 series train information 

Chizu Express
Named passenger trains of Japan
Railway services introduced in 1994
West Japan Railway Company